Hypotyphlus is a genus of ground beetles in the family Carabidae. There are about 16 described species in Hypotyphlus.

Species
These 16 species belong to the genus Hypotyphlus:

 Hypotyphlus andorranus Español & Comas, 1984
 Hypotyphlus aubei (Saulcy, 1863)
 Hypotyphlus bastianinii Magrini & Vanni, 1994
 Hypotyphlus degiovannii Magrini, 2013
 Hypotyphlus guadarramus (Ehlers, 1883)
 Hypotyphlus huetei Ortuño, 1997
 Hypotyphlus lidiae Hernando & Fresneda, 1993
 Hypotyphlus lorinae Avon & Courtial, 2009
 Hypotyphlus lusitanicus J.Serrano & Aguiar, 2004
 Hypotyphlus navaricus (Coiffait, 1958)
 Hypotyphlus pandellei (Saulcy, 1867)
 Hypotyphlus revelieri (Perris, 1866)
 Hypotyphlus rialensis (Guillebeau, 1890)
 Hypotyphlus ribagorzanus (Bolivar y Pieltain, 1919)
 Hypotyphlus sardous (Jeannel, 1937)
 Hypotyphlus sotilloi Español, 1971

References

Trechinae